Hiram Hutchinson (1808–1869) was an American industrialist of British origin. In 1853 he founded a rubber company in France that was the predecessor of Hutchinson SA, a multinational industrial conglomerate. The company was sold by his family in 1898, 29 years after Hutchinson's death.

Having acquired patent rights to the vulcanisation of rubber from Charles Goodyear in 1853, Hutchinson went to France to set up a mill in Châlette-sur-Loing, Loiret. He spent roughly a year in the region, enough time to initiate manufacturing and turning over management of the factory to his son, Alcander.

Later, Hutchinson returned to the United States, where he conducted research on other applications of rubber, which he (correctly) predicted would be useful for a variety of products, including tires, boots, and sealant, all of which are now manufactured by Hutchinson SA.

Despite undergoing corporate restructuring on more than one occasion, Hutchinson's company still operates the original plant at Châlette-sur-Loing.

References

American industrialists
1808 births
1869 deaths
19th-century American businesspeople